Tales and Songs from Weddings and Funerals is a solo album by Goran Bregović, a famous Balkan composer widely popular for making music for films.

Track listing
Hop Hop Hop (lead vocal: Šaban Bajramović)
Tale I (Grave Disperato) / For wind orchestra and clock
Aven Ivenda (lead vocal: Vaska Jankovska)
Sex (lead vocal: Šaban Bajramović)
Tale II (Adagio Poco Febrile) / For wine glasses and strings
Maki Maki (lead vocal: Šaban Bajramović)
Tale III (Lento Arabesco) / For Zdravko Čolić and the Georgian Male Choir
So Nevo Si (lead vocal: Ljudmila Radkova, Danijela Radkova, Lidija Dakova, Dejan Pešić, Srđan Pejić, Ogi Radivojević, Goran Bregović)
Tale IV (Moderato Melancolico) / For violin, cow horn, harp and strings
Cocktail Molotov (lead vocal: Goran Demirović)
Tale V (Andante Amoroso) / For Eb clarinet and orchestra
Polizia Molto Arabbiata (lead vocal: Goran Demirović)
Tale VI (Adagio Delicato) / For wine glasses and strings
Te Kuravle (lead vocal: Vaka Jankovska)
Tale VII (Vivo Con Fuoco) / Scherzo for gypsy orchestra

2002 albums
Goran Bregović albums
Mercury Records albums